Elsa Laubach Jemne (1887–1974) was an American landscape painter, portraitist, muralist and illustrator born in St. Paul, Minnesota. She attended the St. Paul Institute before continuing her art studies at the Pennsylvania Academy of Fine Arts in Philadelphia.

Jemne returned to the Midwest, where she made most of her art. She completed several murals in Minnesota and Wisconsin on commission for the Section of Painting and Sculpture, which were created in public buildings such as post offices and courthouses. She also had works in local schools and similar institutions, and illustrated several books, including two by Norwegian writer Marie Hamsun translated into English.

Education
Jemne was a student of Violet Oakley, Cecilia Beaux, Daniel Garber, Emil Carlsen, and Joseph Pearson. She was awarded the Cresson Traveling Scholarship in both 1914 and 1915. While still a student, Jemne made commercial art, which she found "stupid, uncongenial, & maddening in its monotony."

Life
Elsa Jemne became an advocate for art and culture in her home state of Minnesota in the early 20th century during the Great Depression. Not interested in commercial art, she traveled by bus throughout what is known as "the Iron Range of Northern Minnesota." She was commissioned to paint several murals depicting locally and regionally important themes. She completed six murals under the auspices of the Section of Painting and Sculpture, which commissioned works for United States post offices and courthouses. She completed Minnesota, an allegorical depiction of her home state, in 1937, in a style that reveals the influence of both Oakey and Diego Rivera on her work.

She had married architect Magnus Jemne, with whom she sometimes collaborated. One of their collaborations was the Art Moderne-style Saint Paul Women's City Club. Elsa Laubach Jemne died in St. Paul, Minnesota in 1974.

Work
 Her New Deal artworks include pieces in the following buildings: 
Hutchinson, Minnesota post office, mural titled The Hutchinson Singers, completed in 1942, egg tempera on plaster
Ely, Minnesota post office, two tempera-on-plaster murals titled Iron-Ore Mines and Wilderness 
Ladysmith, Wisconsin post office, tempera on plaster mural titled Development of the Land, completed in 1938; since painted over 
Lake Geneva, Wisconsin post office, oil on canvas mural titled Winter Landscape, completed in 1940 
Stearns County Courthouse in St. Cloud, Minnesota
Minneapolis Armory, headquarters for Minnesota National Guard, where she painted alongside Lucia Wiley, also from that state

In addition, Jemne had other commissions:
 Central High School, Minneapolis 
 Leamy House, Philadelphia, Pennsylvania
 Nurses Home, St. Luke’s Hospital
 Northern Shores Power Company building
 Saint Paul Women's City Club, St. Paul, murals and terrazzo floors
 Community House, Brandon, Minnesota
 She illustrated a number of books:
 Rudi Finds a Way, by Yolanda Foldes
 A Norwegian Family, by Marie Hamsun and translated by Maida Castelhun Darnton
 A Norwegian Farm by Marie Hamsun; abridged and translated by Maida Castelhun Darnton 
 We of Frabo Stand by Loring MacKaye

References

1880s births
1974 deaths
20th-century American women artists
American muralists
20th-century American painters
American women painters
Pennsylvania Academy of the Fine Arts alumni
Painters from Minnesota
Section of Painting and Sculpture artists
Artists from Saint Paul, Minnesota
Women muralists